Lucian Sîrbu (born 16 October 1976 in Bucharest) is a former Romanian rugby union footballer. He played as a scrum-half.

Sîrbu played at Grivița Roșie and Steaua București, in Romania, until moving to Racing Métro 92, in France. He moved to AS Béziers, in 2007.

He had his first cap for Romania, at 20 February 2000, in a 39–10 win over Netherlands. He was selected for the 2003 Rugby World Cup finals, playing all the four matches and scoring a try, and for the 2007 Rugby World Cup finals, playing again in all the four matches.

Sîrbu had 76 caps, from 1996 to 2011, with 9 tries scored, 45 points in aggregate.

External links

1976 births
Living people
Romanian rugby union players
Rugby union scrum-halves
Rugby union players from Bucharest
CSA Steaua București (rugby union) players
Romania international rugby union players
Romanian expatriate rugby union players
Expatriate rugby union players in France
Romanian expatriate sportspeople in France
Racing 92 players
AS Béziers Hérault players